Matlock Bath is a civil parish in the Derbyshire Dales district of Derbyshire, England.  The parish contains 44 listed buildings that are recorded in the National Heritage List for England.  Of these, three are listed at Grade II*, the middle of the three grades, and the others are at Grade II, the lowest grade.  The parish contains the village of Matlock Bath and the surrounding area.  The listed buildings are arranged along the valley of the River Derwent and on the steep hillside to the west.  Most of the listed buildings are houses, cottages, shops, and associated structures.  The other listed buildings include hotels and public houses, churches, a former cotton mill, an obelisk, a railway station and an associated building, a war memorial, and two telephone kiosks.


Key

Buildings

References

Citations

Sources

 

Lists of listed buildings in Derbyshire